Álbaro Rudesindo is a Dominican Republic freestyle wrestler. He won the silver medal in the 65 kg event at the 2019 Pan American Games held in Lima, Peru.

In 2020, he competed in the Pan American Olympic Qualification Tournament held in Ottawa, Canada without qualifying for the 2020 Summer Olympics in Tokyo, Japan. He also failed to qualify for the Olympics at the World Olympic Qualification Tournament held in Sofia, Bulgaria.

He won the bronze medal in his event at the 2022 Bolivarian Games held in Valledupar, Colombia.

References

External links 
 

Living people
Year of birth missing (living people)
Place of birth missing (living people)
Dominican Republic male sport wrestlers
Pan American Wrestling Championships medalists
Pan American Games medalists in wrestling
Pan American Games silver medalists for the Dominican Republic
Medalists at the 2019 Pan American Games
Wrestlers at the 2019 Pan American Games
Central American and Caribbean Games bronze medalists for the Dominican Republic
Competitors at the 2018 Central American and Caribbean Games
Central American and Caribbean Games medalists in wrestling
21st-century Dominican Republic people